Arche (stylized as ARCHE, Greek for "the origin") is the ninth studio album by Japanese heavy metal band Dir En Grey, released on December 10, 2014. It was preceded by two singles;  "Rinkaku", which was released two years prior, and "Sustain the Untruth".

Overview
The contents of the album as well as the track list were added to the band's website in late September. At that time, the band's guitarist Die said it would be the most achieved sound that they have ever had. The album will deal with the theme of pain, as shown in a trailer narrated by Ryō Horikawa released on November 12.

The title stands for "origin" in Greek. This title connotes a special meaning to the members as it encompasses every phase the band has been evolving into. Vocalist Kyo said via Dir En Grey's website : "This album is being worked on with me thinking about the past and future of myself as a vocalist, more than I have had ever before. That place where the old me and the new me crosses is what is being put into the 9th album 'ARCHE. The art cover suggests this symbolism by depicting a beheaded torso of a pregnant woman from which emanates roots.

Track listing 

Disc 2 of the Limited Edition includes only tracks 3, 5, 6.

Chart performance

References

Dir En Grey albums
Japanese-language albums
2014 albums